The Dundee Elephant was an unnamed female Indian elephant.

On 23 November, 1705, Adam Kerr protested to the Edinburgh Dean of Guild Court about the tenant living above his bakery. Kerr’s shop and baking oven was exposed to dung and water coming from the flat above, which was a result of Adam Sever keeping an elephant in the property.

Background 
The story of the Dundee Elephant dates back to 1688 when she was shown at a trade fair in Leipzig at 10 years old. Over the next 13 years she was displayed around various European countries such as Germany, the Netherlands, Italy, Poland, Switzerland and France accompanied by an "African Jungle-Donkey” thought to be a mandrill or an aardvark and a bizarre three-legged animal.

By 1701 she arrived in London when her owner Bartel Verhagen died and was later rented out to Abraham Sever in Edinburgh.

On 31 October, 1705, Sever filed a petition to show his elephant off to the people of Edinburgh as it was unlikely they would have seen an elephant before. The petition was passed and he was later allowed to show off his elephant.

In 1706 the elephant made its way to Dundee in a malnourished state and passed away.

Death 
The exact cause of death is unknown, some people say she died of exhaustion and hypothermia while others claim she drowned in a nearby ditch.

It was going to be expensive to dispose of the elephants corpse so she was handed over to Dr. Patrick Blair which became the first person to dissect and describe the Indian elephant. During the dissection armed guards were sent out to the elephant as locals were determined to take pieces of the her as a trophy. All of the bones were recovered and assembled in the 'Hall of Rarities' in Dundee and the skin was stuffed. Blair wrote all of his findings in a paper titled Osteographia Elephantina to the Royal Society of London, published in 1713.

See also
 List of individual elephants

References

Further reading
   (Fictional treatment)  Second edition: 
Individual elephants